Billy Nair (27 November 1929 – 23 October 2008) was a South African politician, a member of the National Assembly of South Africa, an anti-apartheid activist and a political prisoner in Robben Island.

Nair was a long-serving political prisoner on Robben Island along with Nelson Mandela in the 'B' Block for political prisoners. His Prison card is the copy used in the post-reconciliation prison tours to illustrate the conditions of the prisoners of the time. He was elected to the African National Congress (ANC) executive committee in 1991 and was a South African member of parliament for two terms prior to his retirement in 2004.

His given name was ITTYNIAN Rungasamy Nair.It was then changed to Billy Nair after the 1956 Treason Trial.

Early life
Nair was born in Sydenham, Durban in the then province of Natal, to Indian parents on 27 November 1929. His parents were Parvathy(daughter of a Passenger Indian) and Krishnan Nair (Ittynian Nair) who had been brought from Kerala, India as an indentured labourer. 
He was one of five children; his siblings were Joan, Angela, Jay and Shad. His youngest brother died of typhoid in 1942. His father was an illiterate ship cargo man and mother supplemented the income by owning a vegetable stall in the Indian market.

He attended school in Essendene Road Government Aided Indian School in Sydenham and Natal Technikon or M.L. Sultan Technical College (see Durban University of Technology), Durban at night and completed his matriculation in 1946 and diploma in accounting in 1949. During his school year, he also worked part-time as a shop assistant from 1946 - 48 for a timber merchant of Indian origin and as a bookkeeper for an accounting firm.

Early political activism
During his education days, he was politicized as a participant in the students union. Like many of his fellow leaders in the future, the "Asiatic Land Tenure and Indian Representation Act", also known as the "Ghetto Act" galvanized his political beliefs. In 1949, he became a member of the Natal Indian Youth Congress and was elected as its secretary in 1950. He started attending Natal Indian Congress (NIC) meetings becoming a member of its executive in 1950.

Billy Nair continued his string of jobs and matriculation. After the National Party government came to power in 1948, the position of the authorities towards the protesters became very hostile. After six months stint as a dairy worker at Clover Dairy earning 24 pounds a month, he was fired in 1950 as a result of his trade union activities. As he explained in an interview in 1984 about this period, "We had to politicize workers. A means to establish a link between political struggle and the struggle for higher wages had to be found". He continued his trade union activities, eventually becoming the full-time secretary of the Dairy Worker's Union in 1951. He was banned from political activities as part of the ban imposed in Natal of all that had served as secretaries of 16 trade unions under the Suppression of Communism Act.

Nair came under the influence of Dr. G. M. "Monty" Naicker, president of the Natal Indian Congress. In the resistance again the Ghetto act, no fewer than 2000 prisoners were arrested. Nair was among the first group of resisters who were arrested at the Berea station with 21 other fellow-protesters for entering a "Europeans only" waiting room. He was imprisoned for one month.

In 1953 Nair joined the secretly reconstituted South African Communist party and was a leading member of the South African Congress of Trade Unions when it was formed in 1955 and served on its national executive committee.

Nair was among the 150 activists arrested with Mandela on 5 December 1956 and charged with treason. The marathon Treason Trial of 1956–1961 followed. Two months into the trial, the initial indictment was dropped, and immediately a new indictment was issued against 30 people, all ANC members. He was acquitted of all charges. Speaking of the incident, Nair later remarked, "The State wanted to actually bottle us up, thinking that the struggle will die out..."

Arrest and imprisonment
After the banning of ANC in 1960, Nair became a member of the underground organization Umkhonto we Sizwe (MK) which was led by Mandela. Nair went underground for two months before being arrested and detained for 3 months. He was banned for 2 years which was subsequently extended to 5 years in 1961. Between 1961 and 1963, he participated in the armed struggle as part of MK and was involved in the bombing of Indian Affairs Department. On 6 July 1963, Nair was arrested and charged with sabotage and attempting to overthrow the government by violent means and sentenced to 20 years on Robben island along with other members of the Natal Command of MK, including Curnick Ndlovu, Ebrahim Ebrahim, Natoo Barberina, Riot Mkwanazi, Albert Duma, Erick Mtshali and 12 others.

Billy Nair, as Prisoner 69/64 (the 69th prisoner of 1964) served in the same block as Mandela and Kathrada.

Billy Nair was assaulted multiple times in prison quite seriously and he joined multiple efforts including a five-day hunger strike to bring about reforms at the prison. In this, he partially succeeded. He was punished severely for his efforts by isolation and removal to the common block. He was also denied food and educational privileges for various periods of time. There was controversy on which groups were instrumental in making the changes in Robben island, including the provision of beds of prisoners, permission to study and improved meals with various groups claiming credit. Upon release, he remarked on this, "when I came out of prison in 1984 I actually publicly said that these Coopers, the AZAPOS, the Strini Moodleys and the whole shoot of them actually came into a five star hotel.  We changed the conditions so much that they were living in milk and honey virtually."

Whilst in prison, Nair was an active participant of the "University" which was informal education system run by prisoners; he also obtained study privileges in time and completed B.A. (in English), and B.COM degrees through the University of South Africa. Even though he completed most of the required classes toward a B.PROC degree, he had to abandon it after several detentions. Sonny Venkatrathnam, a fellow prisoner smuggled a copy of Shakespeare into the prison in which all the leading prisoners marked their favorite passages; this copy was later called the Robben Island Bible. Billy Nair chose Caliban's lines from The Tempest: 'This island's mine, by Sycorax my mother'.

He was released on 27 February 1984 from prison.  Thereafter he joined the United Democratic Front (UDF) office and participated in the anti-election campaign of 1984. The UDF was an umbrella organization that brought together hundreds of organizations to protest against the Nationalist governments policies and the new constitution. He was again detained in August, just before the elections for the House of Delegates under section 29 of the internal Security Act.

Upon his release Nair went into hiding. He and 5 other UDF leaders Archie Gumede, Mewa Ramgobin, Paul David, George Sewpershad and MJ Naidoo – sought refuge in the British Consulate until 12 December.

In 1990, after De Klerk lifted the State of Emergency in July, Nair was re-arrested along with 40 members of ANC accusing them as conspirators in Operation Vula to overthrow the government.

Activities after release
After the unbanning of the ANC in February 1990, Nair served on the interim leadership committees of both the ANC and the South African Communist Party. He was elected to the ANC National Executive Committee in July 1991.

In the first all-inclusive democratic South African elections in 1994, Nair was elected as a member of parliament for the ANC; he was placed 39 in the list of 400 candidates proposed by the ANC. He served two terms as an MP with distinction until 2004. He was a member of the following Parliamentary Committees: Joint Standing Committee Finance, Constitutional Comm. Theme 3, Constitutional Comm. Sub Theme 2 & Theme 6 and Joint Standing Committee Public Accounts. Millions of renters and landlords owe a big debt to Nair for the passage of Rental Housing Act 50 of 1999, and for establishing the provincial Rental Housing Tribunals.

Nair was married to Elsie Nair(his second wife). Billy had one daughter(from his 1st wife), Saro Nair and two grand daughters, Lena and Tasha who live in England.

Honours and awards
Nair received the "Moses Kotane Award" for his outstanding contribution to the SACP while still in prison.
He was also awarded a Doctorate of Social Science posthumously for the advancement of human rights and democracy in 2009 by the University of KwaZulu-Natal.

He was awarded the Pravasi Bharatiya Samman by the Ministry of Overseas Indian Affairs in 2007. The Gandhi Development Trust and Satyagraha award was also presented to him in August 2007.

Death
Nair was admitted to the intensive care unit of St Augustine's Hospital in Durban in October 2008 suffering from a combination of cardiac problems and other complications and after one week, died on 27 October 2008. He was given a Provincial funeral in KwaZulu-Natal attended by premier S'bu Ndebele. His death was mourned by ANC, SACP and COSATU and by people from all walks of life. His funeral was held on 29 October at the Durban Exhibition Center.

See also
 Pravasi Bharatiya Samman
 Pravasi Bharatiya Divas
 South African Communist Party
 African National Congress
 List of Nairs

References

Anti-apartheid activists
South African people of Indian descent
Malayali people
1929 births
2008 deaths
People acquitted of treason
South African prisoners and detainees
Inmates of Robben Island
Natal Indian Congress politicians
African National Congress politicians
South African Communist Party politicians
Members of the National Assembly of South Africa
Durban University of Technology alumni
Members of the Order of Luthuli
Apartheid in South Africa
People from Durban
Racial segregation
Recipients of Pravasi Bharatiya Samman